C.I.D. In Jungle is a 1971 Indian Malayalam film, directed and produced by G. P. Kammath. The film stars Sathyan, T. S. Muthaiah, Abbas and Devika in thelead roles. The film had musical score by Bhagyanath.

Cast
Sathyan
T. S. Muthaiah
Abbas
Devika
Madhumathi
S. P. Pillai
K. V. Shanthi

Soundtrack
The music was composed by Bhagyanath and the lyrics were written by Kedamangalam Sadanandan.

References

External links
 

1971 films
1970s Malayalam-language films